Gilberto Leonel Machado García (born 23 March 1962) is a retired Honduran footballer who played as a midfielder for Marathón, Olimpia, and Deportes Progreseño in Liga Nacional de Fútbol Profesional de Honduras.

He is the current manager of Honduran second division side Sula de La Lima.

Club career
Born in San Pedro Sula, Machado played club football in Honduras. He made his debut for Marathón on 29 July 1979 against Atlético Portuario and scored his first goal on 22 February 1981 against Real España. Machado was the Honduran league's top goal-scorer in 1987, scoring 19 goals for Marathon. He is also Marathon's all-time leading goal-scorer, scoring 78 goals from 1979 to 1991.

In 1991, Machado transferred to Olimpia for one season scoring 4 goals, and then finished his career with Deportes Progreseño.

International career
Machado only played a handful of matches for Honduras. His final international was a June 1991 UNCAF Nations Cup match against El Salvador.

Career statistics

Club

International goals

Managerial career
After he retired from playing, Machado became a football coach. He has managed Honduras Progreso in the Liga Nacional de Ascenso de Honduras.

Personal life
Machado is married to Nancy Sobeyda Quintero and the couple have two kids: Leonel Alberto and Andrea Fabiola.

References

1962 births
Living people
People from San Pedro Sula
Association football midfielders
Honduran footballers
Honduras international footballers
C.D. Marathón players
C.D. Olimpia players
Honduran football managers
C.D. Marathón managers
Real C.D. España managers